The 1998 Big Ten men's basketball tournament was the inaugural postseason men's basketball tournament for the Big Ten Conference and was played from March 5 through March 8, 1998 at the United Center in Chicago, Illinois. The championship was won by Michigan who defeated Purdue in the championship game. As a result, Michigan received the Big Ten's automatic bid to the NCAA tournament.

Due to the Michigan basketball scandal, Michigan has vacated the records from this tournament. Similarly, due to the Minnesota academic scandal, Minnesota's appearance in this tournament was vacated.

Seeds

All 11 Big Ten schools participated in the tournament. Teams were seeded by conference record, with a tiebreaker system used to seed teams with identical conference records. Seeding for the tournament was determined at the close of the regular conference season. The top five teams received a first round bye.

Bracket

Source:

All-Tournament Team
 Robert Traylor, Michigan – Big Ten tournament Most Outstanding Player (Vacated) 
 Jerod Ward, Michigan 
 Quincy Lewis, Minnesota 
 Brad Miller, Purdue 
 Mike Robinson, Purdue

References

Big Ten men's basketball tournament
Tournament
Big Ten men's basketball tournament
Big Ten men's basketball tournament